Kenchō-mae Station is an HRT station on the Astram Line, located in 10-90, Motomachi, Naka-ku, Hiroshima.

Platforms

Connections
█ Astram Line
●Hondōri Station — ●Kenchō-mae — ●Jōhoku

Other services connections
█ Hiroden Main Line / █ Hiroden Ujina Line
Hiroden Main Line Connections at Hiroden Kamiya-cho-nishi Station
Hiroden Main Line Connections at Hiroden Kamiya-cho-higashi Station

█ Bus Service Routes
Bus Service Route Connections at Hiroshima Bus Center

Around station

Underground
Kamiyachō Shareo

North
Hiroshima Museum of Art
Hiroshima Green Arena
Hiroshima Castle
Hiroshima Gokoku Shrine
Hiroshima Central Park (Chūō Kōen)

South
Hiroshima Hondōri Shōtengai

East
Hiroshima Prefectural Government Offices (Kenchō)
Hiroshima City Hospital

West
Hiroshima Bus Center
Motomachi Cred
Sogo
Hiroshima Municipal Stadium
Hiroshima Peace Memorial

History
Opened on August 20, 1994.

See also
Astram Line
Hiroshima Rapid Transit

References 

Kencho-mae Station
Railway stations in Japan opened in 1994